The 2022 Connecticut Attorney General election took place on November 8, 2022, to elect the Attorney General of Connecticut. Incumbent Connecticut Attorney General William Tong won re-election to a second term.

Democratic primary

Candidates

Nominee
William Tong, incumbent attorney general

Endorsements

Republican primary

Candidates

Nominee
Jessica Kordas, attorney

General election

Predictions

Results

See also
Connecticut Attorney General

References

Attorney General
Connecticut
Connecticut Attorney General elections